Trebonne is a rural town and locality in the Shire of Hinchinbrook, Queensland, Australia.

History
Prior to European settlement, the Trebonne area was inhabited by the Warakamai People.

The town derives its name from Trebonne Creek, which was allegedly named by Leon Burguez, sugar planter who lived at Gairloch, probably in the 1870s.

Upper Trebonne Provisional School opened on 7 November 1906. On 1 January 1909 it became Upper Trebonne State School. It was renamed Trebonne State School circa 1932.

In 1951 Canossa Catholic Primary School was established by Canossia Daughters of Charity. It closed on 6 December 2013.

Heritage listings
Trebonne has a number of heritage-listed sites, including:
 Trebonne Road: Pelota Mano Court

Education 
Trebonne State School is a government primary (Prep-6) school for boys and girls at 71 Stone River Road. In 2017, the school had an enrolment of 19 students with 3 teachers (2 full-time equivalent) and 6 non-teaching staff (3 full-time equivalent).

References

Further reading

External links

 
 

Towns in Queensland
North Queensland
Shire of Hinchinbrook
Localities in Queensland